Zamzam Ibrahim is a student politician who was the President of the UK National Union of Students (NUS) in 2019–2020. She is also the President and a founding trustee of Students Organising for Sustainability. She succeeded Shakira Martin. She was formerly the NUS Vice President of Society & Citizenship. This followed her term as Salford Students' Union President 2017-2018 and Vice-President of Business and Law 2015–2016. Before she was a full-time officer at NUS, she served on the National Executive Committee for two years. She is now the Vice-President of the European students union.

Early life and career
Zamzam was born in Sweden in 1994 and is Somali, but moved to Greater Manchester at an early age. She is fluent in Swedish, Somali and English. Before becoming an elected officer at NUS, Zamzam worked as a fundraiser for Penny Appeal, an interpreter for Pearl Linguistics Ltd, a radio presenter at ALLFM 96.9 and a project worker at Bolton Solidarity Community Association. She has been a vocal advocate against FGM (Female Genital Mutilation). She went to the University of Salford and gained a first class degree in Accounting & Finance. During her time at University she was President of the Somali society and was in multiple other societies such as TedX and Business. She has volunteered for organisations such as Human Appeal.

Presidency of NUS
Ibrahim took office on 1 July 2019. During her term as President she has headed up multiple campaigns including the drive to get young people registered to vote in the 2019 General Election, the campaign for a National Education Service and leading the Teach the Future Campaign.

She was succeeded by Larissa Kennedy in July 2020.

References

Presidents of the National Union of Students (United Kingdom)
Living people
1994 births
Alumni of the University of Salford
People from Manchester
English people of Somali descent